E. Eugene Yaw (born February 26, 1943) is an American politician from Pennsylvania currently serving as a Republican member of the Pennsylvania State Senate for the 23rd district since 2009.

Early life and education
Yaw was born to Emerson A. and Harriet Yaw.  He graduated from Montoursville High School and attended Bucknell University from 1961 to 1963.  He served in the U.S. Army from 1964 to 1968 and graduated from the United States Army Field Artillery School in Fort Sill, Oklahoma.  He was honorably discharged as first lieutenant after an overseas tour of duty as an artillery officer.  He graduated from Lycoming College with a B.A. in 1970 and received a J.D. degree from American University in 1973.

Career
He served as Lycoming County solicitor for 17 years and currently serves as a Republican member of the Pennsylvania Senate for the 23rd district since 2009.

He has been a supporter of legislation related to Marcellus Shale drilling and the gas industry.

He was a recipient of the National Federation of Independent Business Award for his voting record in support of small businesses in Pennsylvania.

Committee assignments 
 Environmental Resources & Energy, Chair
 Judiciary, Vice Chair
 Agriculture & Rural Affairs
 Banking & Insurance
 Rules & Executive Nominations
 Urban Affairs & Housing

References

External links
State Senator Eugene Yaw official PA Senate website
Yaw for Senate official campaign website
State Senator Eugene Yaw official Party website

1943 births
20th-century American lawyers
21st-century American politicians
American University alumni
Living people
Lycoming College alumni
Military personnel from Pennsylvania
Pennsylvania lawyers
Republican Party Pennsylvania state senators
Politicians from Lycoming County, Pennsylvania